Ananda Dwarika (born 17 December 1962) is a Trinidadian cricketer. He played in three first-class matches for Trinidad and Tobago in 1987/88 and 1988/89.

See also
 List of Trinidadian representative cricketers

References

External links
 

1962 births
Living people
Trinidad and Tobago cricketers